John Bevan  (1837 – 16 July 1911) was a 19th-century member of the House of Representatives. He was an auctioneer and merchant from Hokitika on the West Coast of New Zealand.

Early life and commercial career
Bevan was born in Jersey on the Channel Islands in 1837 into a Welsh family. He received his education at Jersey Grammar School and emigrated to Victoria in Australia in 1857 before moving to Hokitika in New Zealand in circa 1865. He entered a partnership with Michael Pollock and they traded as auctioneers and merchants under the banner of Pollock and Bevan in Hokitika's Revell Street. He remained in Hokitika for the rest of his life.

Political career

Bevan belonged to many organisations. He was a longstanding member of the Westland Board of Education and for some time was the board's chairman. He was a member of the High School Board. He was a member of the Westland Land Board and got voted onto the Hokitika Borough Council. He was president of the Westland Hospital Board of Trustees. He was a Visiting Justice to Hokitika Prison and an official visitor to the local mental hospital.

Fitzgerald, a brother of prominent politician James FitzGerald, had lived in Hokitika until 1880 but was a newspaper editor in Wanganui by the time he was elected in 1881 and remained a North Island resident. Bevan had a 4 percentage point margin over Fitzgerald, with Clarke coming a distant third. He represented the Hokitika electorate until 1887, when he was defeated by Joseph Grimmond 830 votes to 610.

Freemasonry
Bevan was a District Grand Master of Freemasons in Westland.

Family and death
On 7 May 1900, Bevan married the widow Anne Clery ( Handley) at All Saints' Church. Bevan suffered a long and serious illness in 1909 and never fully recovered from it. He died at Hokitika on 16 July 1911 aged 74. He was survived by his wife Anne and two stepchildren. His funeral at Hokitika Cemetery was an Anglican service with Masonic ceremony, largely attended by Freemasons from throughout Westland. Anne Bevan died in Dunedin in 1928.

References

1837 births
1911 deaths
Jersey people
People from Hokitika
New Zealand MPs for South Island electorates
Members of the New Zealand House of Representatives
Unsuccessful candidates in the 1887 New Zealand general election
19th-century New Zealand politicians
Burials at Hokitika Cemetery
New Zealand Freemasons
Jersey emigrants to Australia
Jersey emigrants to New Zealand